Kesertaş is a village in the Gerger District, Adıyaman Province, Turkey. The village is populated by Kurds of the Culur tribe and had a population of 149 in 2021.

References

Villages in Gerger District
Kurdish settlements in Adıyaman Province